Turajlić is a family name found in Serbia and Bosnia.

Notable people with the surname include:

 Hakija Turajlić (1936–1993), Bosniak politician, economist and businessman, Deputy Prime Minister of Bosnia and Herzegovina
 Mila Turajlić (born 1979), Serbian documentary film maker, daughter of Srbijanka Turajlić
 Srbijanka Turajlić (1946–2022), Serbian academic and pro-democracy political activist, also mother of the film maker Mila Turajlić

Serbian surnames
Bosnian surnames